Jacques Dufilho (19 February 1914 – 28 August 2005) was a French actor. He was born at Bègles (Gironde) and he died at Ponsampère (Gers).

Life and career
Dufilho appeared in 65 French productions. Moreover, he was frequently seen in Italian films. In 1978 he received a César Award for Best Supporting Actor for his performance in Le Crabe-tambour and in 1980 another one for his role in Un mauvais fils.

The actor was also known as a collector of Bugatti vintage cars.

Selected filmography

References

External links
 
 

1914 births
2005 deaths
French male film actors
People from Bègles
Best Supporting Actor César Award winners
20th-century French male actors
21st-century French male actors